Robert Laing Noble  (February 3, 1910 – December 11, 1990) was a Canadian physician who was involved in the discovery of vinblastine.

Born in Toronto, Ontario, he received his M.D. from the University of Toronto in 1934 and a Ph.D. in 1937 from the University of London.

In the 1950s he helped with the discovery of vincristine and vinblastine, widely used anti-cancer drugs.

In 1997, he was inducted into the Canadian Medical Hall of Fame. In 1988, he was made an Officer of the Order of Canada. In 1984, he was awarded the Gairdner Foundation International Award. He was a member of The Harvey Club of London, the oldest medical club in Canada.

The Robert L. Noble Prize is named in his honour.

References

1910 births
1990 deaths
Alumni of the University of London
Canadian medical researchers
Fellows of the Royal Society of Canada
Officers of the Order of Canada
People from Toronto
University of Toronto alumni
20th-century Canadian physicians